Nina Cook Silitch (born December 5, 1972) is an American ski mountaineer, is married to Michael Silitch, has 2 children; Birken and Anders Silitch.

Selected results 
 2010:
 1st, World Championship team race, together with Jari Kirkland
 2011:
 1st, World Championship relay (together with Jari Kirkland and Janelle Smiley)
 1st, World Championship team race (together with Janelle Smiley)
 1st, World Championship sprint race. (Individual)

Pierra Menta 

 2009: 1st, together with Lyndsay Meyer
 2010: 1st, together with Lyndsay Meyer
 2011: 1st, together with Veronika Swidrak
 2012: 1st, together with Valentine Fabre

Patrouille des Glaciers 

 2010: 1st (and 1st in the "international civilian women" ranking), together with Lyndsay Meyer and Monique Merrill

Trofeo Mezzalama 

 2011: 1st, together with Valentine Fabre and Lyndsay Meyer

External links 
 Nina Cook Silitch at skimountaineers.org

References 

1972 births
Living people
American female ski mountaineers
21st-century American women